James Oakes (5 November 1902 – 7 November 1992) was an English footballer who played as a full-back.

Noted for his clean play, he turned professional at Port Vale in November 1923. He played at The Old Recreation Ground for ten years, helping the "Valiants" to top the Third Division North in 1929–30. He was sold on to Charlton Athletic for £3,000 in January 1933. He helped the "Addicks" to the Third Division South title in 1934–35, promotion out of the Second Division in 1935–36, and then second place in the First Division in 1936–37. His career was ended by the outbreak of World War II.

Playing career

Port Vale
Oakes played for Bethesda Mission and Milton Albion before joining Port Vale as an amateur in August 1923, signing as a professional in November of that year. He played two Second Division games in 1923–24, before becoming a regular in the side from October 1924. He played 31 games in 1924–25 and 42 games in 1925–26, scoring his first senior goal in a 5–2 defeat to South Shields on 1 May 1926. He made 45 appearances in 1926–27 and 41 appearances in 1927–28, as the club continued to post top ten finishes. His career survived a cartilage operation in November 1928 as he returned to regular football four months later to finish the season with 26 games to his name; the "Valiants" suffered relegation after finishing two points short of safety.

He managed a rare feat in scoring from his own half in a 2–1 defeat to Stockport County at The Old Recreation Ground on Christmas Day 1929, albeit with help from the wind. Oakes made 36 appearances in the 1929–30 season as Vale finished top of the Third Division North, playing alongside Billy Wootton, George Shenton, and Bill Cope in a solid and consistent defence. Oakes and Shenton formed a formidable partnership in 1930–31, as Vale posted the highest league finish in the history of the club; he played 41 games, scoring one goal. He featured 32 times in 1931–32, helping Vale to avoid relegation only due to their superior goal average to Barnsley. He played 12 games in 1932–33, before he was sold to Charlton Athletic for £3,000 in January 1933, with Port Vale desperately needed the funds.

Charlton Athletic
With the "Addicks" he became the first player to play for the opposing club in a re-arranged match. He played for Charlton in their 2–1 home win over Vale after the original fixture was abandoned on the previous Boxing day. Charlton went on to finish the season bottom of the Second Division, and were thus relegated into the Third Division South. After Charlton finished fifth in 1933–34, they went on to top the division in 1934–35. A second successive promotion came in 1935–36, when they finished as Second Division runners-up, just one point behind Manchester United. They then finished second in the First Division in 1936–37, three points behind champions Manchester City. They finished fourth in 1937–38, six points behind champions Arsenal. Charlton then finished third in 1938–39, nine points behind champions Everton. When World War II was upon the country, Oakes guested for Port Vale in March 1940, and later Stoke City.

International career
Oakes played for "Rest" (effectively a Football League select XI) against the England side in 1928.

Style of play
Oakes was a talented and consistent full-back. He was noted as being a clean player, who never resorted to rough play or dirty tricks.

Personal life
Oakes was a pigeon fancier, as was his father. During the 1970s, he worked as Commercial Manager of a brass foundry in the Potteries.

Career statistics
Source:

Honours
Port Vale
Football League Third Division North: 1929–30

Charlton Athletic
Football League Third Division South: 1934–35
Football League Second Division second-place promotion: 1935–36

References

1902 births
1992 deaths
Sportspeople from Hanley, Staffordshire
English footballers
Association football defenders
Port Vale F.C. players
Charlton Athletic F.C. players
Port Vale F.C. wartime guest players
Stoke City F.C. wartime guest players
English Football League players